Ganaraska Region is a region located in Ontario, Canada, stretching along the shore of Lake Ontario for approximately  and about  wide. This expansive area includes seven municipalities in whole or in part: Township of Cavan Monaghan, Town of Cobourg, Township of Alnwick/Haldimand, Township of Hamilton, Municipality of Port Hope, City of Kawartha Lakes, Municipality of Clarington.

Ganaraska Forest
It is located between the counties of Northumberland, Peterborough, Victoria and Durham.

Ganaraska River

Ganaraska Hiking Trail
The trail was started in 1968.

References

External links
 Map
 Ganaraska Region Conservation Authority

Forests of Ontario
Geographic regions of Ontario